Everything's Eventual is the debut and only studio album by Canadian duo Appleton, made up of sisters (not twins) Natalie and Nicole Appleton. It was released on February 24, 2003, through Polydor Records. Three singles were released from the album: "Fantasy", "Don't Worry" and "Everything Eventually".

"We created the album ourselves off our own backs so there was no need to change any elements when we signed our new deal. It has just been mixed since we signed to Polydor," the duo said. "We love our All Saints fans and hope we can also attract new fans as our music has developed. We've been enjoying playing around with new ideas in the studio with no limits and it’s a new beginning for us."

The album is named after the Stephen King short story collection Everything's Eventual, since Natalie Appleton is a great admirer of him. The album was initially to be named Aloud but the name was changed to avoid any association with then labelmates winners Girls Aloud. The album and singles performed reasonably well on the UK charts; however the label thought that 70,000 copies sold was too little for their contract, and this eventually led to Appleton being dropped by Polydor.

On 8 February 2023, almost 20 years after the album was originally released, it was confirmed that Demon Music Group, in conjunction with Fascination Management (who now manage both Nicole and Natalie as members of All Saints since their comeback in 2016), would be reissuing the album on coloured vinyl for its 20th anniversary on 17 June 2023, with exclusive unseen art prints, full lyrics and new liner notes.

Track listing

Charts and certifications

Weekly charts

Certifications and sales

References

2003 debut albums
Albums produced by Marius de Vries
Polydor Records albums